The 2020–21 season was Crystal Palace's eighth consecutive season in the Premier League (extending their longest ever spell in the top division of English football) and the 115th year in their history. This season, Palace participated in the Premier League, FA Cup and EFL Cup. The season covered the period from 27 July 2020 to 30 June 2021. Palace finished the season in fourteenth place which also saw the departure of manager Roy Hodgson upon the expiration of his contract.

Season summary

September
Crystal Palace started the Premier League season strongly, with Wilfried Zaha scoring his 50th league goal to give Palace a 1–0 home win over Southampton. However, in the Carabao Cup second round, Bournemouth edged Palace in an epic penalty shootout (which finished 11–10) after a 0–0 draw.
The defeat did not knock confidence however, as in the next game, Palace won 3–1 against Manchester United, with Wilfried Zaha scoring a brace against his former club. Palace suffered their first league defeat to end off the month, with Dominic Calvert-Lewin scoring in a 2–1 win for Everton.

October
Palace started October dreadfully, with Ben Chilwell scoring and assisting on debut for Chelsea in a 4–0 defeat. The next game was derby-day against Brighton & Hove Albion, with Alexis Mac Allister scoring a late equaliser for the Seagulls just before their captain Lewis Dunk was sent off. Palace got back to winning ways with Jairo Riedewald and Wilfried Zaha scoring in a 2–1 away win against Fulham, who had Aboubakar Kamara sent off late on. However, the good form was short-lived, as Palace fell to a 2–0 away defeat against Wolverhampton Wanderers, where Rayan Aït-Nouri scored and Palace captain Luka Milivojevic was sent off in the closing minutes.

November
Palace started November strongly once more, with Eberechi Eze assisting and scoring once in a 4–1 win over Leeds United. Once again, the good form was short-lived, as Palace were defeated 1–0 by Burnley, with Chris Wood scoring the only goal. The next game increased the woes, as Callum Wilson and Joelinton scored late on to stun Roy Hodgson’s side in a 2–0 loss to Newcastle United.

December
In a trend similar to previous months, Palace started very well with a 5–1 away win over West Bromwich Albion, Wilfried Zaha scoring twice and providing an assist after Matheus Pereira’s red card. However, the good form did not drop off, as the first game at Selhurst Park with fans since 7 March was a 1–1 draw with league leaders Tottenham Hotspur, with Vicente Guaita making superb saves to deny Tanguy Ndombele, Eric Dier, and Harry Kane twice. The next game also ended 1–1, against West Ham United, however it was Palace's turn to drop points after Sebastien Haller’s bicycle kick. History was made in the next game, as for the first time in their history Palace conceded 7 goals at home, to Liverpool. The next game wasn't much better, Anwar El Ghazi scoring a stunning goal in a 3–0 away loss at 10-man Aston Villa. However, some form of consolation came at the end of the month, with Vicente Guaita saving Kelechi Iheanacho’s penalty early on against Leicester City, but joy was short-lived, as Harvey Barnes scored a late equaliser. The game finished 1–1.

January
Palace started 2021 with a bang, as Eberechi Eze scored a stunning goal, running 60–70 yards and shooting into the bottom right corner, in a 2–0 home win over Sheffield United. However, in the FA Cup, Palace lost 1–0 to Wolves with Adama Traoré scoring the only goal. Palace had their first goalless draw of the season, against Arsenal, 5 days later, but that same week the suffers a 4–0 defeat away to Manchester City, with John Stones scoring a brace. The next game wasn't an improvement, as it was Tomas Soucek's turn to score a brace, in a 3–2 home loss to West Ham United. The next game was at home to Wolves, Palace gainining revenge for their FA Cup defeat, as Eze scored the only goal of the game to seal a 1–0 win.

February
Palace started the month by beating Newcastle 2–1 away, Gary Cahill scored the winner after Jonjo Shelvey & Jairo Riedewald traded long-range strikes. In the next game the Eagles suffered a 2–0 away loss at Leeds United, with former Eagles loanee Patrick Bamford scoring his 100th career goal. After Palace had returned home from their trip to Yorkshire, they were welcomed by a 3–0 home loss to Burnley, with Matt Lowton scoring a superb volley. The next game was against rivals Brighton, with Christian Benteke stunning the opposition with a stoppage-time winner. The month ended with a 0–0 home draw with Fulham.

March
March started as February ended, this time with Palace frustrating Manchester United at home in a 0–0 draw. The next game saw Palace beaten 4–1 by Tottenham Hotspur, with Harry Kane scoring a brace and providing two assists for Gareth Bale. Palace got back to winning ways in the middle of the month, with a Luka Milivojević penalty wrapping up a 1–0 home win over West Bromwich Albion.

April
After a three-week break, Michy Batshuayi smashed in a late equaliser in a 1–1 draw away at Everton. Despite keeping 3 clean sheets at home in a row, Christian Pulisic’s brace ended that run in a 4–1 home loss to Chelsea. After yet another international break, Kelechi Iheanacho scored a stunning goal in a 2–1 away loss at Leicester City, despite Palace going 1–0 up early on.

May
Palace started the month with a 2–0 home loss to soon-to-be champions Manchester City, in which Sergio Aguero and Ferran Torres scored. The next game was at already-relegated Sheffield United’s home ground, Bramall Lane. Christian Benteke and Eberechi Eze scored the goals in a 2-0 Palace win. A disappointing away day in midweek saw Danny Ings score twice in a 3–1 away loss at Southampton. The penultimate home game of the season came against Aston Villa F.C., with Palace coming back from 1–0 and 2–1 down to win 3–2. The long-awaited return of fans came against Arsenal, with Nicolas Pépé scoring twice in a disappointing 3–1 home defeat, however it was vital for Arsenal as it increased their faint hopes of qualifying for the Europa Conference League. The season ended with Sadio Mané scoring twice for Liverpool in a 2–0 away loss at Anfield. Palace ended the season in fourteenth place, which also saw the departure of manager Roy Hodgson upon the expiration of his contract.

Pre-season friendlies

Competitions

Overview

Premier League

League table

Results summary

Results by matchday

Matches
The 2020–21 season fixtures were released on 20 August.

FA Cup

The third round draw was made on 30 November, with Premier League and EFL Championship clubs all entering the competition.

EFL Cup

The draw for both the second and third round were confirmed on 6 September, live on Sky Sports by Phil Babb.

Player statistics

Appearances and goals

|-
! colspan=14 style=background:#DCDCDC; text-align:center| Goalkeepers

|-
! colspan=14 style=background:#DCDCDC; text-align:center| Defenders

|-
! colspan=14 style=background:#DCDCDC; text-align:center| Midfielders

|-
! colspan=14 style=background:#DCDCDC; text-align:center| Forwards

|-
! colspan=14 style=background:#dcdcdc; text-align:center| Players out on loan

|-
! colspan=14 style=background:#DCDCDC; text-align:center| Left team during season

|}

Goalscorers

Disciplinary record

Transfers

Transfers in

Loans in

Loans out

Transfers out

Notes

References

External links

Crystal Palace F.C. seasons
Crystal Palace F.C.
Crystal Palace
Crystal Palace